Fernando Adolfo Enrique (born 16 September 1985) is an Argentine professional footballer who plays as a midfielder for Talleres RE.

Career
Enrique appeared for Primera B Nacional's Almagro in 2006, making eighteen appearances. In 2007, Enrique joined Colo-Colo of the Chilean Primera División. He dropped down to Primera B Metropolitana for the 2007–08 campaign, featuring twenty-nine times for Talleres. A short stint with Tristán Suárez in 2008 followed, prior to the midfielder signing for fellow third tier team Brown in 2009. He scored seven goals in his opening three seasons with them, which preceded a loan move to Primera B Nacional side Rosario Central for 2012–13. He appeared just once, as a starter versus Central Córdoba in the Copa Argentina.

Enrique returned to Brown, with the club now playing in tier two after 2012–13 promotion. On 9 July 2014, Enrique completed a move to Defensores de Belgrano of Primera C Metropolitana. Three goals in eighteen matches followed as they were promoted to Primera B Metropolitana. Another promotion came four seasons later in 2017–18, after he had scored fifteen goals in that period. In July 2018, Enrique remained in the same division after agreeing terms with Atlanta. His first goal arrived in his twelfth appearance, netting in a four-goal win away to ex-club Talleres.

Personal life
Enrique is the son of former footballers Héctor Enrique, who won the 1986 FIFA World Cup, and nephew of Carlos Enrique. His brothers, Ramiro (football) and Facundo (rugby), are also sportsmen.

Career statistics
.

References

External links

1985 births
Living people
Argentine footballers
Argentine expatriate footballers
People from Lomas de Zamora Partido
Association football midfielders
Enrique family
Sportspeople from Buenos Aires Province
Primera Nacional players
Primera B Metropolitana players
Primera C Metropolitana players
Club Almagro players
Colo-Colo footballers
Talleres de Remedios de Escalada footballers
CSyD Tristán Suárez footballers
Club Atlético Brown footballers
Rosario Central footballers
Defensores de Belgrano footballers
Club Atlético Atlanta footballers
Expatriate footballers in Chile
Argentine expatriate sportspeople in Chile